The Text Books is an Iranian documentary (in five parts) by Mahmoud Shoolizadeh. It introduces the strengths and weaknesses of textbooks in Iran. Editors, experts and teachers explain their views and critic the current situation of textbooks in Iran.

Iranian documentary films
1990 films
Persian-language films
Documentary films about education
Textbook business